Robert Gibbs (born 1971) is an American communications professional who was White House Press Secretary from 2009 to 2011

Robert Gibbs or Gibbes could also refer to: 

Robert Gibbes (1644–1715), Carolinian English colonial governor
Bobby Gibbes (Robert Henry Maxwell Gibbes, 1916–2007), Australian military pilot
Robert Henry Gibbs (1929–1988), American ichthyologist
Bob Gibbs (Australian politician) (Robert James Gibbs, born 1946), member of the Legislative Assembly of Queensland 
Bob Gibbs (Robert Brian Gibbs, born 1954), American politician and member of the U.S. House of Representatives from Ohio

See also
Robert Gibb (disambiguation)
Robert Gibbes House